Nicolae Păun may refer to:
 Nicolae Păun (politician)
 Nicolae Păun (footballer)